The Silver Reliquary of Indravarman is an inscribed silver Buddhist reliquary dedicated by Apracaraja king Indravarman in the 1st century BCE, which has been found presumably in the Bajaur area of Gandhara. Believed to have been fabricated at Taxila, the silver reliquary consists of two parts—the base and the cover—both being fluted, and the cover being topped by a figure of long horned Ibex. It has been dated to around the eighth or ninth decades of the 1st century BCE and bears six inscriptions written in pointillē style, in Kharoshthi script and Gandhari/north-western Prakrit. In form, the silver vessel is wholly atypical of Buddhist reliquaries and is said to have been a wine goblet, similar to others found in Gandhara and Kapisa regions. The vessel was later reused by Apraca king Indravarman as a Reliquary to enshrine Buddhist relics in a stüpa raised by Indravarman. The inscriptions on the silver reliquary provide important new information not only about the history of the kings of Apraca dynasty themselves but also about their relationships with other rulers of the far north-western region of traditional India i.e. modern northern Pakistan and eastern Afghanistan around the beginning of Christian era.

The inscriptions on the silver reliquary have been investigated by Richard Salomon of the University of Washington, in an article published in the Journal of the American Oriental Society.

Form and function
The lower part of the reliquary with fluted surface, carination and small stem and foot is extremely similar to the "drinking goblets" that have been found in good numbers mainly in Gandhara (Taxila) and Kapisa (Kapisi).  The lower part of the reliquary resembles the ceremonial drinking cups depicted in ancient Gandharan art and culture relief. Gandharan art of Bacchanalian or Dionysiac drinking scenes are the motifs which represent assimilation of local folk traditions of remote river valleys of the Kafiristan where viticulture and wine festivals are known to have been widely practiced. Similar customs are also well documented in recent times in the region of Nuristan (pre-Islamic Kafiristan) which area had formed integral parts of ancient Kapisa. Bajaur, the presumed provenance of the silver reliquary, was part of the ancient Kapisa. In this very region of Kafiristan  or ancient Kapisa, the heirloom silver wine cups  with features very similar to those of old Gandhara and Kapisa goblets are still found and before the Islamization of Kafiristan, these silver wine cups were important ritual objects and symbols of social status. Martha Carter associates the well attested wine festival tradition of the valleys of Hindukush with Dionysiac scenes in Gandharan art in general and heirloom silver cups of the modern Nuristanis with Gandharan goblets in particular which is quite persuasive.Dionysiac Festivals  and Gandharan Imagery, Res Orienttales 4, pp 51-59, Martha Carter

According to Dr Richard Salomon, "if the association is even approximately correct, it may explain what the new silver reliquary originally may have been. It was undoubtedly a ceremonial silver drinking cup of Indo-Iranian king Kharaosta and later of his successor prince Indravarman who converted it into a sacred reliquary for the bones of Buddha". The Nuristani customs represents the survival in remote region of a local (Bajaur) tradition of ritual wine drinking which, in Buddhist world of Gandhara, may have been assimilated to and rationalized by the cosmological realm of the 'Sadamattas', who dwell on the slope of Mt Meru. The figure of Ibex topping the cover of the reliquary definitely implies Trans-Pamirian (Central Asian) influence and establishes a proof of early migration of people (Kambojas) from the Transoxian region (i.e., the Parama Kamboja of Central Asia or Scythian region) into the Kabul valley. The Ibex motif is quintessentially characteristic of Iranian and Central Asian (Scythian) art and culture. It reflects the arrival and assimilation, by whatever geographic route or routes, of this ancient Central Asian/Iranian motif into the Gandharan world in Pre-Christian times. And lastly, the fluting in the surfaces of the silver reliquary is also an Iranian motif. Thus the Ibex motif combined with wine drinking culture of the goblet itself amply illustrates the influx of regional and extra-regional cultural elements into the eclectic art and culture of Gandhara of the Indo-Iranian/Indo-Scythian period which is indeed reflected in the silver reliquary of prince Indravarman.

Contents of inscriptions

 Apracarajas' relations with yuvaraja Kharaosta
The inscriptions refer to several well-known historical figures and also introduce some previously unknown persons. Noteworthy among the former are prince Indravarman and king Khara(y)osta who is to be identified with ruler Kharahostes or Kharaosta who had been known from numismatics and Mathura Lion Capital inscriptions. The Inscription no. II also establishes that king Kharaosta was also the original owner and the silver vessel was later inherited by Apraca dynasty. Thus it very offers tantalizing hints of some close relationship between king Kharaosta and the Apraca kings of Bajaur.

Bajaur, the home of Aspasioi clan
The territory around the findspot for the silver reliquary was the stronghold of the warlike Indo-Iranian people called Aspasioi (Aspasian) who had formed the western branch of the Ashvakas of the Sanskrit texts.Many kings of Apraca dynasty have used  Varman as the surname or last name. Varman as surname implies Kshatriya caste and has been used by Ksatyriya lineages in ancient times (See entry "Varman" in Monier Williams Sanskrit-English Dictionary; See also entry "Varman" in: Cologne Digital Sanskrit English Dictionary). It is worthy to note that   the Kambojas have repeatedly been described as Kshatriyas in ancient Indian texts (See:Pāṇini's Astadhyayi Sutra 4.1.168-175; Harivamsa 14.19-20; Vayu Purana, 88.127-43; Manusmriti X.43-44; Mahabharata 13.33.20-21); Cf also: (Mahabharata 13.35.17-18); Kautiliya's Arthashastra 11.1.1-4. Thus the fact that many kings of the Apraca dynasty used Varman last name indicates that the Apraca dynasty belonged to Kshatriya lineage and hence most likely belonged to the Ashvaka branch of the Indo-Iranian Kamboja tribe. Prashant Srivastava of the University of Lucknow, has in a research monograph highlighted the significant role played by the family of the Apraca kings in ancient Indian history, and connected this family of the Apraca kings with the Ashvaka clan. But, the Ashvaka clan was none else than a sub-branch of the greater Kamboja tribe spread on either side of the Hindukush. (See Ashvakas.) These people, identified as sub-branch of the Kambojas, had earlier offered stubborn resistance to Macedonian invader  Alexander in 326 BCE and later also constituted an important component of the grand army of Chandragupta Maurya.They find pre-eminent mention as Kambojas in the Rock Edicts V as well XIII of king Ashoka (reign 273 BCE to 232 BCE) located in Shabaz Garhi in Peshawar Valley and Mansehra District of North-West Frontier Province, Pakistan. According to Dr Bailey, the dynastic/geographic title Apraca/Apaca/Avaca may underlie the modern toponym Bajaur.

Kharayosta or Kharaosta king vs Apraca dynasty
The inscriptions provide important new information on the history of Apraca dynasty of Bajaur, including the names of several previously unknown persons, and on their relationship with Indo-Iranian king Kharayosta—the Yuvaraya Kharaosta "Kamuio"  of the Mathura Lion Capital inscriptions or Kharaoṣta (Kharahostes) of the coins. Prince Kharaosta in the Bajaur silver vessel has been described as Yagu-raja as contrasted to Yuva-raja of the Mathura Lion Capital Inscriptions or the Kshatrapa of the coins. First part Yagu- of the title Yagu-raja used by Kharaosta (Kamuio) is a form of Yauvuga or Yauga or Yaüvasa—a Kushana title, which is identified with popular Turkic title Yabgu (i.e. tribal chief). Since this reference pertains to pre-Christian and therefore, pre-Kushana/Pre-Turkic times, this conclusively proves that the use of a title is no proof of a ruler's ethnic affinities. The silver reliquary definitely indicates some sort of connections between prince Kharaosta (Khara(y)osta) and the Apraca kings of Bajaur but it is hard to say if the connections are merely of succession only or were formed by blood or ethnic bonds also.  The inscription no. II on the silver reliquary was inscribed by yaguraja Khara(y)osata who was the first owner of the silver vessel and the inscriptions no. III, IV, VI and VI on the same reliquary were later inscribed by Apraca king Indravarman which show the latter as the owner of the same vessel. Inscriptions also verify that Apraca king Indravarman  had later converted the silver vessel to a Buddhist Reliquary for the stüpa he had raised in Bajaur.

The connection of Apraca kings with Yagu-raja Kharaosta has raised chronological questions which call into doubt previously established norms about him and also seem to require a considerably earlier date for the Mathura Lion Capital Inscriptions (in which he is twice mentioned as Yuvaraja Kharaosta), than is usually attributed to him. Kharaosta is believed to have been the ruler of Cukhsa—a territory comprising districts of Peshawar, Hazara, Attock and Mianwal in northern Pakistan. The Apraca kings of Bajaur are believed to have been an important allies of Kharaosta in helping to protect his borders from ever-present threat of invasion from the west. It does not, therefore, seem unlikely that Arta (Mahakshatrapa), Kharaosta Kamuio (Yuvaraja), Aiyasia Kamuia (Agramahisi—the chief queen of Rajuvula), Maues or Moga (Gandhara king) as well as the rulers of Apraca dynasty of Bajaur were probably all related and were connected by some sort of familial connections. The fact that Kharaosta and his daughter Aiyasi have both been referred to as Kamuias in the Mathura Lion Capital inscriptions  may also hold a clue that the Apraca dynasty was also probably a Kamuia (Kamboja) dynasty. The surname Kamuia is a Kharoshthised/Prakritised form of Pali Kambojika or Sanskrit Kamboja. See main article: Kamuia

See also
 Cetiya
 Bimaran reliquary
 Indravarma reliquary
 Kanishka reliquary
 Rukhuna reliquary
 Apracharajas

Footnotes

References

Bibliography

Further reading
Afghanistan, carrefour en l'Est et l'Ouest" p. 373. Also Senior 2003
Baums, Stefan. 2012. “Catalog and Revised Texts and Translations of Gandharan Reliquary Inscriptions.” In: David Jongeward, Elizabeth Errington, Richard Salomon and Stefan Baums, Gandharan Buddhist Reliquaries'', pp. 233–234, Seattle: Early Buddhist Manuscripts Project (Gandharan Studies, Volume 1).
Baums, Stefan, and Andrew Glass. 2002– . Catalog of Gāndhārī Texts, no. CKI 241
Senior, R.C. (2006). Indo-Scythian coins and history. Volume IV. (in English). Classical Numismatic Group, Inc.. .

Indo-Scythian peoples
Kambojas
Archaeological discoveries in Afghanistan
Archaeology in Pakistan
Ancient India
Iranian archaeological artifacts
History of Pakistan
Silver objects
Buddhist reliquaries